Jayson Lusk (born 1974) is an economist, Distinguished Professor and Department Head in the Department of Agricultural Economics at Purdue University.  He authors books and articles related to contemporary food policy issues.

Education and career

Lusk received his B.S. in Food Technology in 1997, from Texas Tech University, and his Ph.D. from Kansas State University in Agricultural Economics. Lusk began his career as assistant professor at Mississippi State University and then associate professor at Purdue University from 2000 to 2005. From 2005 to 2013 Lusk was Professor and Willard Sparks Endowed Chair at Oklahoma State University, Department of Agricultural Economics. During that time he also was a Visiting Researcher at the French National Institute for Agricultural Research. In 2017 Lusk became Distinguished Professor and Head of Purdue University, Department of Agricultural Economics.

Over his career, Lusk has published over 200 peer-reviewed articles in academic journals, including the Economic Journal, the American Journal of Agricultural Economics, and Journal of Environmental Economics and Management.  Lusk's first popular press book The Food Police: A Well-fed Manifesto about the Politics of Your Plate criticized modern food policies as being intrusive. He frequently appears on Fox News to discuss research related to food. His second book Unnaturally Delicious: How Science and Technology are Serving Up Super Foods to Save the World describes how Lusk believes that changes in food technology can save the planet.

Awards
He is a Fellow and Past President of the Agricultural & Applied Economics Association.  In 2018, he was awarded the Borlaug Communication Award from the Council for Agricultural Science and Technology.

Books
Unnaturally Delicious: How Science and Technology are Serving Up Super Foods to Save the World. 2016. St. Martin's Press. .
 The Food Police: A Well-Fed Manifesto About the Politics of Your Plate. 2013. Crown Forum. .
 Compassion, by the Pound: The Economics of Farm Animal Welfare, with F. Bailey Norwood. 2011. Oxford University Press. .
 Oxford Handbook of the Economics of Food Consumption an Policy, edited with Jutta Roosen and Jason Shogren. 2011. Oxford University Press.  .
 Experimental Auctions: Methods and Applications in Economic and Marketing Research (Quantitative Methods for Applied Economics and Business Research), with Jason Shogren. 2008. Cambridge University Press. .
 Agricultural Marketing and Price Analysis, with F. Bailey Norwood. 2007. Prentice Hall. .

References

External links

Oklahoma State University faculty
21st-century American economists
Agricultural economists
Living people
1974 births